Malene ( or Μαληνή) was a town of ancient Aeolis in the Atarneitis. At Malene, Histiaeus was defeated by the Persians.

Its site is located near Bahçeli, Asiatic Turkey.

References

Populated places in ancient Aeolis
Former populated places in Turkey